Round the Bend is an album by American jazz saxophonist Rob Brown recorded in 2001 and released on the French Bleu Regard label. It features a trio with bassist William Parker and drummer Warren Smith.

Reception

In his review for AllMusic, Glenn Astarita states "The band sustains a flexible disposition via fragmented rhythmic exercises and Brown's homogeneous blend of soul-stirring choruses and verbose dialogues."
The All About Jazz review by John Kelman notes that "The interplay, especially between Parker and Brown, is strong; this is free playing with a purpose, a sense of direction, and a sense of construction."

Track listing
All compositions by Rob Brown except as indicated
 "Lampost Ring" – 9:52
 "Ripples – 9:34 
 "Unwind" – 10:20
 "A Flower is a Lovesome Thing" (Billy Strayhorn) – 12:08
 "Loaded Hand" –9:24
 "A Whirl" – 2:48 
 "Unfurling" – 10:27

Personnel
Rob Brown – alto sax
William Parker  – bass
Warren Smith – drums

References

2002 albums
Rob Brown (saxophonist) albums